Mercurys origins are obscure. She may have been launched in New York in 1774, possibly under another name. In 1793 she made one voyage as a slave ship in the Atlantic triangular slave trade. A French privateer captured Mercury, but the Royal Navy recaptured her.

Career
A Mercury of 126 ton (bm) first appeared in Lloyd's Register (LR), in 1793.

Capture (1793): Captain George Hauit sailed from Liverpool on 1 January 1793. Mercury gathered slaves at Bance Island. She sailed from Africa on 7 August. 

Mercury was captured off Cape Mount.

The cutter  recaptured Mercury. In December 1793 Lloyd's List reported that Mercury, Hewitt, master, had arrived at Barbados.

Captain Hewitt purchased the recaptured Mercury.

Notes

Citations

References
 
 

1790s ships
Age of Sail merchant ships of England
Liverpool slave ships
Captured ships